Panorama Peak is a rock peak 0.5 nautical miles (0.9 km) north of Mount Thundergut on the ridge extending to Plane Table, in the Asgard Range, Victoria Land. The name applied by New Zealand Antarctic Place-Names Committee (NZ-APC) presumably alludes to excellent views available from the summit.

Mountains of the Asgard Range
McMurdo Dry Valleys